"Boy's a Liar" is a song by British singer PinkPantheress. It was released on 30 November 2022 through Warner Records as a single and included on her extended play, Take Me Home, in December 2022. Written and produced by PinkPantheress and Mura Masa, "Boy's a Liar" is a dance-pop, bubblegum pop, and synth-pop song with a Jersey club beat, elements of chiptune and hyperpop, and lyrics about feeling inadequate in a relationship. It gained traction on TikTok soon after its release and later peaked at number two in the UK, Ireland, and Australia.

A remix of the song with American rapper Ice Spice, titled "Boy's a Liar Pt. 2", was released through Parlophone Records, Elektra Records, and 3EE on 3 February 2023. It features an additional verse from Ice Spice, and its music video, directed by George Buford and Frederick Buford, depicts both performers in various locations throughout New York City. The remix was received well by critics and became PinkPantheress's first entry on the Billboard Hot 100 and the first top-10 for both PinkPantheress and Ice Spice after it peaked at number three on the chart, also peaking at number three on the Billboard Global 200. The remix also reached number one in New Zealand and number two in Canada.

Original version

Background and composition

Prior to the release of "Boy's a Liar", English singer PinkPantheress found success on TikTok and with the release of her debut mixtape To Hell with It. Record producer Mura Masa, who had previously produced PinkPantheress's 2021 single "Just for Me", produced "Boy's a Liar" at the studio in Mura Masa's garden at home, where the two had been spending time together due to their living close to one another. The song was made in about two hours. After PinkPantheress released the Kaytranada-produced "Do You Miss Me?" in early November 2022, "Boy's a Liar" was released through Warner Records on 30 November 2022 and later included on her extended play Take Me Home, released in December 2022. It became popular on TikTok, where it soundtracked over 760,000 videos .

"Boy's a Liar" runs for two minutes and 11 seconds. It is a dance-pop, bubblegum pop, and synth-pop song with elements of chiptune and hyperpop. It was written and produced by PinkPantheress and Mura Masa; on it, PinkPantheress sings with "plush and quiet" vocals about her insecurities with feeling unattractive to her partner due to a toxic relationship. PinkPantheress based it
on a real relationship with a man who "ended up being a liar after the song came out" and who she threatened to put a hex on. She also likened the song's theme to "that feeling that someone's only interested in you when you look good", while Mura Masa described the song as an expression of PinkPantheress's "borderline-misandrist tendencies". Its lo-fi production features a Jersey club beat, kick drums, and 8-bit synths, and ends with a squeaking sound typically used in Jersey club songs. The drums were inspired by the increasing popularity of Jersey and Baltimore club music in popular music in 2023 with songs like Lil Uzi Vert's 2022 song "Just Wanna Rock".

Reception
Shaad D'Souza of Pitchfork called "Boy's a Liar" "one of PinkPantheress' strongest tracks" and the only song on Take Me Home that "really holds its own against PinkPantheress' most indelible hits" as PinkPantheress was "step[ping] fully into the pop star role that she's been trying on over the past year".

After spending 10 weeks on the UK Singles Chart, "Boy's a Liar" peaked at number two on the chart dated 24 February 2023. It also peaked at number two on the ARIA Charts.

Charts

Certifications

Remix

Background and composition
A remix of "Boy's a Liar", titled "Boy's a Liar Pt. 2", came about after Ice Spice followed PinkPantheress on Instagram and PinkPantheress sent her a direct message saying that she would like to meet up if Ice Spice was ever in the UK, to which Ice Spice replied that she was a fan of hers. After Ice Spice posted the original version of "Boy's a Liar" on her Instagram story, PinkPantheress replied asking to collabrate. PinkPantheress used the stems of the instrumental by Mura Masa, who was uninvolved in the remix, to produce the remix. "Boy's a Liar Pt. 2" was released on 3 February 2023 through Parlophone, Elektra Records, and 3EE.

"Boy's a Liar Pt. 2" is largely the same as the original song with the exception of the second verse, which is replaced by an additional verse from Ice Spice. In contrast with PinkPantheress's "timid fragility", Ice Spice raps with a "raspy voice" and a "collected, indifferent delivery" about a deceitful lover who is already in a relationship. She ends her verse by "drop[ping] her invulnerable posture", rapping, "But I don't sleep enough without you/And I can't eat enough without you".

Music video, promotion, and live performance
The music video for "Boy's a Liar Pt.2" was directed by George Buford and Frederick Buford and filmed throughout New York City, including on the rooftop of a Harlem apartment building. "Boy's a Liar Pt. 2" was promoted by Warner by getting social media influencers, including livestreamers, to make reaction videos to the song. Two mannequins dressed as Ice Spice and PinkPantheress were also placed on a rooftop in Central London in front of graffiti reading "LIAR" in early March 2023 in promotion of the song, though a group of TikTok users stole the mannequin of Ice Spice later that month. Ice Spice performed "Boy's a Liar Pt. 2" live for the first time during her performance at Rolling Loud California in March 2023. PinkPantheress also performed "Boy's a Liar" during a critically-derided set at South by Southwest in 2023.

Commercial performance
"Boy's a Liar Pt. 2" debuted at number 14 on the Billboard Hot 100 chart on 18 February 2023. It became Mura Masa and PinkPantheress's first entries on the Hot 100. The following week, the song rose to number four on the chart, marking the first top-10 entry on the chart for both Ice Spice and PinkPantheress. It was the first duet between two artists making their top-10 debut to reach the top-10 in two weeks or less since "Calling My Phone" by Lil Tjay and 6lack debuted at number three in February 2021. It peaked at number three the next week.

The song also debuted at number 15 on the Billboard Global 200 chart, where it peaked at number three about two weeks after its debut. Elsewhere, it topped the chart in New Zealand and peaked at number two in Canada.

Critical reception
LaTesha Harris of NPR praised "Boy's a Liar Pt. 2" as "never overstay[ing] its welcome", calling Ice Spice's verse "hilarious". Pitchforks Matthew Ritchie called "Boy's a Liar Pt. 2" "an impeccable team-up from a baddie and her baddie friend". For Complex, Joe Price wrote that "Ice Spice effortlessly blends into the track on the remix", while Stereogums Tom Breihan wrote that the song "works" and that there was "something really fun about the idea of PinkPantheress and Ice Spice making music together". Spencer Kornhaber of The Atlantic wrote that "Boy's a Liar Pt. 2" was "undeniably catchy and yet feels as fleeting as a mild dream" and that what was "most remarkable about the song" was "its featherweight feeling". For Vulture, Reanna Cruz wrote that "Boy's a Liar Pt. 2" "serves as a bridge between the hack-iness of sped-up trend hopping and genuine artistic needle-pushing".

Charts

Certifications

Release history

References

2022 singles
2022 songs
2023 singles
PinkPantheress songs
Ice Spice songs
Number-one singles in New Zealand
Songs written by Ice Spice
Warner Music Group singles
Parlophone singles
Bubblegum pop songs
Elektra Records singles
Dance-pop songs

Songs about infidelity